The Nedbank Cup is a South African club football (soccer) tournament. The knockout tournament, based on the English FA Cup format, was one of a weak opponent facing a stronger one. The competition was sponsored by ABSA until 2007, after which Nedbank took over sponsorship.

Mamelodi Sundowns, the winner of the 2014–15 Nedbank Cup, qualified for the 2016 CAF Confederation Cup.

Format
The 16 Premier Soccer League clubs, 8 National First Division teams, as well as 8 teams from the amateur ranks compete for the title. The winner also qualifies for the CAF Confederation Cup.

The teams are not seeded at any stage, and the first 16 sides drawn out of the hat receive a home-ground advantage. There are no longer any replays in the tournament, and any games which end in a draw after 90 minutes are subject to 30 minutes extra time followed by penalties if necessary.

Results

Final

External links
Nedbank Cup Official Website

Notes and references

2014–15 domestic association football cups
2014–15 in South African soccer
2014-15